1994–95 Alpenliga season In 1994, the Alpenliga was temporarily merged into the newly created Six Nations Tournament. In addition to teams from Northwestern Italy and Western Austria, this season also featured teams from the French Alps. Three new leagues - the Adriatic League, the Atlantic League and the Danube League were also created. Teams from the Alpenliga played off against teams from the other three leagues in the 1994 Six Nations Tournament.

Final table

Alpenliga seasons
2
Alpenliga
Alpenliga